Sipplingen is a municipality in the district of Bodensee in Baden-Württemberg in Germany.

World Heritage Site
It is home to one or more prehistoric pile-dwelling (or stilt house) settlements that are part of the Prehistoric Pile dwellings around the Alps UNESCO World Heritage Site.

References

Bodenseekreis